is a passenger railway station located in the city of Hitachi, Ibaraki Prefecture, Japan operated by the East Japan Railway Company (JR East).

Lines
Ōmika Station is served by the Jōban Line, and is located 137.4 km from the official starting point of the line at Nippori Station.

Station layout
The station consists two opposed side platforms connected to the station building by a footbridge. The station has a Midori no Madoguchi staffed ticket office.

Platforms

Gallery

History

Ōmika Station was opened on 25 February 1897. The Hitachi Electric Railway operated to this station from 1928 to 2005. The station was absorbed into the JR East network upon the privatization of the Japanese National Railways (JNR) on 1 April 1987.

Passenger statistics
In fiscal 2019, the station was used by an average of 9600 passengers daily (boarding passengers only).

Surrounding area
Port of Ibaraki
 Omika Post Office
Hitachi Seisakusho

Ibaraki Christian University

See also
List of railway stations in Japan

References

External links

  Station information JR East Station Information 

Railway stations in Ibaraki Prefecture
Jōban Line
Railway stations in Japan opened in 1897
Hitachi, Ibaraki